Goddess was a Dutch Eurodance act by producer’s Rob and Ferdi Bolland, fronted by singer Elvira Valentine. They are best known for their 1992 hit single "Sexual".

History
Valentine (born in Amsterdam on January 28, 1962) started her career as a backing vocalist for artists such as Falco and Joe Cocker; she was also part of the duos Say When! (with Ingrid "B.B. Queen" Simons) and Club Risqué (with Daryl White). Goddess released The Sexual Album in 1992, and while it did not chart, the single "Sexual" peaked at #74 on the Billboard Hot 100, staying on the charts for ten weeks. They released a few more singles afterwards, without the same success.

Valentine died from cancer in 2002. The Bolland brothers, who had produced a number of electronic music records since the early 1970s, have been inactive since the end of the 1990s.

Discography

Albums
 The Sexual Album (1992)

Singles
1992
 Sexual
 In My Bed
 Je T'Aime
1993
 Get Loud (Racism Beat It)
1994
 Spirits in the Night
 Tapdancer (I Wanna See You Mooove)

References
 The Isle of Failed Pop Stars: Goddess - The Sexual Album (1992)
 The Eurodance Encyclopaedia: Goddess
 Discogs: Goddess
 Rare and Obscure Music: Goddess

Dutch Eurodance groups